Desiree Francis (born 24 August 1975) is an American former basketball player. Francis grew up in Antigua in the Caribbean. She moved to Iowa in 1996 to attend Kirkwood Community College. Pryor to her arrival at Kirkwood, Francis had not played basketball for four years but was invited to the team by coach Kim Muhl on the recommendation of former Kirkwood player Arnold Barnes. During her two year stint at Kirkwood, the team went 68-5. In 1998 she transferred to Iowa State where she was noted for her good 3-point shooting and defense. She was drafted by the New York Liberty in the 2000 WNBA Draft.

See also
List of foreign WNBA players

References

1975 births
Living people
American women's basketball players
Forwards (basketball)
Iowa State Cyclones women's basketball players
New York Liberty draft picks
New York Liberty players